Pseudolaguvia nubila is a species of catfish from the Kaladan River drainage system in southern Mizoram, India.

References

Erethistidae
Catfish of Asia
Fish of India
Taxa named by Heok Hee Ng
Taxa named by Lalramliana
Taxa named by Samuel Lalronunga
Taxa named by Lalnuntluanga
Fish described in 2013